Gemmula cosmoi is a species of sea snail, a marine gastropod mollusk in the family Turridae, the turrids.

Description
The length of the shell varies between 45 mm and 60 mm.

An almost uncolored to slightly brown shell. It shows a row of tiny nodules on the keel of the whorls. The suture has a row of pointed nodules.

Distribution
This marine species occurs from East Africa to Japan; in the East China Sea, South China Sea and Nansha Islands; off the Philippines.

References

 Sykes, E. R. (1930). On a new species of Turris from Japan. Proceedings of the Malacological Society of London. 19: 82
 Powell, A.W.B. 1964. The Family Turridae in the Indo-Pacific. Part 1. The Subfamily Turrinae. Indo-Pacific Mollusca 1: 227-346
 Steyn, D.G & Lussi, M. (2005). Offshore Shells of Southern Africa: A pictorial guide to more than 750 Gastropods. Published by the authors. Pp. i–vi, 1–289.
 Liu, J.Y. [Ruiyu] (ed.). (2008). Checklist of marine biota of China seas. China Science Press. 1267 pp
 Li B. [Baoquan] & Li X. [Xinzheng]. (2008). Report on the turrid genera Gemmula, Lophiotoma and Ptychosyrinx (Gastropoda: Turridae: Turrinae) from the China seas. Zootaxa. 1778: 1-25.

External links
  Tucker, J.K. 2004 Catalog of recent and fossil turrids (Mollusca: Gastropoda). Zootaxa 682:1-1295.

cosmoi
Gastropods described in 1930